The 1915 Indiana Hoosiers football team was an American football team that represented Indiana University Bloomington during the 1915 college football season. In their second season under head coach Clarence Childs, the Hoosiers compiled a 3–3–1 record and finished in eighth place in the Western Conference. They won games against  (7-0), Miami (OH) (41–0), and Northwestern (14–6), tied with Washington and Lee (7–7), and lost to Chicago (13–7), Ohio State (10–9), and Purdue (7–0).

Schedule

References

Indiana
Indiana Hoosiers football seasons
Indiana Hoosiers football